Thomas John Guiry (born October 12, 1981) is an American actor. He is best known for his lead performance as Scott Smalls in the cult coming-of-age film The Sandlot, which he held at the age of 12, and his role in NBC crime drama The Black Donnellys. He has appeared in numerous high-profile films and television series, including U-571, Black Hawk Down, Mystic River, Black Irish, and The Revenant.

Early life
Guiry was born in Toms River, New Jersey, and attended St. Gregory the Great school in Hamilton Township, Mercer County, New Jersey from kindergarten through eighth grade, and then high school at Notre Dame High School in Lawrenceville, New Jersey.

Career 
His most notable appearances were in The Sandlot, U-571, The Mudge Boy, Black Hawk Down, Mystic River, and The Four Diamonds. Guiry played Jimmy Donnelly on the NBC drama The Black Donnellys.

Personal life 
In 2009, Guiry married his wife, Janelle, at the Crown Reef in Myrtle Beach, South Carolina. In August 2013, he was arrested at George Bush Intercontinental Airport in Houston, Texas, for allegedly head-butting a police officer after he was told he was too drunk to board a flight.

Filmography

Film

Television

References

External links
 

1981 births
Living people
20th-century American male actors
21st-century American male actors
American male child actors
American male film actors
American male stage actors
American male television actors
Male actors from Pennsylvania
Notre Dame High School (New Jersey) alumni
People from Hamilton Township, Mercer County, New Jersey
People from Toms River, New Jersey